The educational computer LC80 was a single-board computer manufactured in the German Democratic Republic (GDR) and intended for teaching purposes. It was the first computer that retail customers could buy in the GDR.

History and development 
The development of the LC 80 started in 1983. At the Leipzig Trade Fair in the spring of 1984 it was presented to the public. Early in 1985 the LC80 was on the market, making it the first computer available to retail customers in the GDR. The computers Z 9001 and HC 900 that had been shown at the same spring fair, could not be manufactured in sufficient quantity and were thus available only to educational institutions.

The production probably ended around 1986/87.

Technical details 
The LC80 was programmed by entering hexadecimal machine codes via a built-in 25-key calculator keyboard (16 hexadecimal keys, 7 function keys, NMI, Reset). Programs could be saved and loaded via cassette tape or EPROM. Beside the CPU the board contained two PIO and one CTC integrated circuits as well as 1 KB of RAM and 2 KB of ROM.

Interfaces:
 cassette tape interface
 12 programmable input / output lines, 4 Handshake lines, and 7 CTC lines
 CPU-bus (unbuffered)

Export version 
Based on a request from the United Kingdom, an export variant was developed. This version differed from the conventional LC80 in the following details:
 wooden cabinet
 12 KB ROM
 4 KB RAM
 keyboard template for chess program  SC-80  (similar to the East German chess computer SC2)
As the order from abroad did not come through in the end, only samples were manufactured of this version.

Software and applications
Except for the operating system, no software was included. The manufacturer published a series of three booklets that contained software as hexadecimal machine code listings.
Software and applications were published in journals such as Funkamateur (Morse code trainer) and Radio Fernsehen Elektronik (EPROM programmer, robot model control). Given the limited availability of computers in East Germany, the LC80 was even used to control scales underground in a potash mine.

See also 
Other microprocessor development systems with a hexadecimal display and hexadecimal program entry: MEK6800D2 (1976), KIM-1 (1976), TK-80 (1976), MK14 (1977), Acorn System 1 (1979), Micro-Professor MPF-I (1981), PMI-80 (1982), TEC-1 (1983)

References

External links 
 Homepage of Volker Pohlers with LC80 section (in German)
 LC80 at robotrontechnik.de (in German)
 LC80 at homecomputermuseum.de (in German)
 Online LC 80 emulator

Computer-related introductions in 1983
Z80-based home computers
Computers designed in Germany
Home computers
Goods manufactured in East Germany
Science and technology in East Germany
Early microcomputers